Becirman (formerly Vergili) is a village in the Gercüş District of Batman Province in Turkey. The village is populated by Kurds of the Bêcirmanî and Elîkan tribes and had a population of 194 in 2021.

References 

Villages in Gercüş District
Kurdish settlements in Batman Province